Anserma is a town and municipality in the Colombian Department of Caldas.

Anserma was founded on August 15, 1539 by Marshal Jorge Robledo.

References

Municipalities of Caldas Department
Populated places established in 1539